Shani Peak is a mountain in the south of Naltar Pass in the Gilgit District of Gilgit-Baltistan, Pakistan. It lies in the west of Snow Dome (5,029 m) and in the northwest of Mehrbani Peak (5,639 m). To its east flows the Shani Glacier towards Naltar Valley. Peak is also known as Khaltar Peak.

See also
 List of mountains in Pakistan
 Naltar Valley

External links
 Northern Pakistan detailed placemarks in Google Earth

Mountains of Gilgit-Baltistan
Five-thousanders of the Karakoram